Kessneria is a genus of air-breathing freshwater snails, aquatic pulmonate gastropod mollusks in the family Planorbidae, the ram's horn snails. 

All species within family Planorbidae have sinistral shells.

Distribution
This genus is endemic to, and restricted to, northern Australia.

Species
Species within this genus include:
 Kessneria papillosa Walker & Ponder, 2001

References

Planorbidae
Taxa named by Winston Ponder